The East–West Link Expressway, or Salak Expressway  (Malay: Lebuhraya Hubungan Timur-Barat), is an extension of Malaysia's Federal Highway from Seputeh to Taman Connaught in Cheras.  It should not be confused with the East–West Highway route 4 that runs from Gerik in Perak to Jeli in Kelantan. This expressway is part of the Kuala Lumpur Southeast Dispersal Link Scheme.

Some maps label the section of the expressway from Seputeh Interchange to Salak South Expressway as a part of the Federal Highway Route 2, but the appellation is incorrect as the East–West Link Expressway was acquired by ANIH Berhad (formerly known as Metramac Corporation Sdn Bhd (MetaCorp)) and not by the PLUS Malaysia Berhad which maintains most parts of the Federal Highway. In 2007, the expressway was coded as E37 with the Kuala Lumpur–Seremban Expressway.

The Kilometre Zero is located at Seputeh Interchange.

History
The construction of the East–West Link Expressway started in 1993 and was completed in 1995. The expressway was opened on 17 August 1995. On 17 May 2011, the toll collections of the expressway from Salak Interchange to Taman Connaught Interchange were abolished.

On 7 April 2011, MetaCorp changed its name into ANIH Berhad after taking over the operations of Toll Concession from MTD Prime Sdn Bhd and MetaCorp who owned the concessions for Kuala Lumpur–Karak Expressway, East Coast Expressway Phase 1, and Kuala Lumpur–Seremban Expressway (including East–West Link Expressway) with effect from 6 December 2011.

Features
 Taman Connaught Pasar Malam (night market) opens every Wednesday from 5:00 pm to 1:00 am. Illegal parking along the expressway is common, hence it is also causing traffic congestion.

Toll rates

List of interchanges

External links
 ANIH Berhad (Formerly known as Metramac Corporation Sdn Bhd)

1995 establishments in Malaysia
Expressways in Malaysia
Expressways and highways in the Klang Valley